List of Odonata species recorded in Finland include all dragonflies (Anisoptera) and damselflies (Zygoptera) which have been recorded in Finland. Currently there are 57 species and only one species (Nehalennia speciosa) is classified as endangered (EN) Six species are protected by law.

Zygoptera (damselflies)

Calopterygidae

Calopteryx splendens, banded demoiselle
Calopteryx virgo, beautiful demoiselle

Lestidae
Lestes dryas, emerald spreadwing
Lestes sponsa, common spreadwing
Sympecma paedisca, siberian winter damselfly (protected by law)

Coenagrionidae 

Coenagrion armatum Dark Bluet
Coenagrion hastulatum Spearhead Bluet
Coenagrion johanssoni Arctic Bluet
Coenagrion lunulatum Crescent Bluet
Coenagrion puella Azure Damselfly
Coenagrion pulchellum Variable Damselfly
Enallagma cyathigerum Common Blue Damselfly
Erythromma najas Red-eyed Damselfly EN
Ischnura elegans Blue-tailed Damselfly
Ischnura pumilio Small Bluetail
Nehalennia speciosa Pygmy Damselfly
Pyrrhosoma nymphula Large Red Damselfly

Platycnemididae 
Platycnemis pennipes White-legged Damselfly

Dragonflies Anisoptera

Aeshnidae 

Aeshna affinis Southern Migrant Hawker
Aeshna caerulea Azure Hawker
Aeshna crenata Siberian Hawker
Aeshna cyanea Southern Hawker
Aeshna grandis Brown Hawker
Aeshna juncea Common Hawker
Aeshna mixta Migrant Hawker
Aeshna serrata Baltic Hawker
Aeshna subarctica Bog Hawker
Aeshna viridis Green Hawker protected by law
Anax imperator Emperor Dragonfly
Brachytron pratense Hairy Dragonfly

Gomphidae 

Gomphus vulgatissimus Common Club-tail
Onychogomphus forcipatus Small Pincertail
Ophiogomphus cecilia Green Snaketail protected by law

Cordulegastridae 
Cordulegaster boltonii Golden-ringed Dragonfly

Corduliidae 
Cordulia aenea Downy Emerald
Epitheca bimaculata Eurasian Baskettail
Somatochlora alpestris Alpine Emerald
Somatochlora arctica Northern Emerald
Somatochlora flavomaculata Yellow-Spotted Emerald
Somatochlora metallica Brilliant Emerald
Somatochlora sahlbergi Treeline Emerald

Libellulidae 

Libellula depressa Broad-bodied Chaser
Libellula fulva Scarce Chaser
Libellula quadrimaculata Four-spotted Chaser
Leucorrhinia albifrons Dark Whiteface protected by law
Leucorrhinia caudalis Lilypad Whiteface protected by law
Leucorrhinia dubia Small Whiteface
Leucorrhinia pectoralis Yellow-Spotted Whiteface protected by law
Leucorrhinia rubicunda Ruby Whiteface
Orthetrum cancellatum Black-Tailed Skimmer
Orthetrum coerulescens Keeled Skimmer
Sympetrum danae Black Darter
Sympetrum flaveolum Yellow-winged Darter
Sympetrum pedemontanum Banded Darter
Sympetrum sanguineum Ruddy Darter
Sympetrum striolatum Common Darter
Sympetrum vulgatum Vagrant Darter

References

See also 
 Finnish Dragonfly Society 
 Sami Karjalainen: Suomen Sudenkorennot (The Dragonflies of Finland). Tammi 2010. 

Odonata species recorded in Finland
Dragonflies of Europe
Finland
Odonata species recorded in Finland